Jean-Baptiste Louis Andrault, marquis de Maulévrier (3 November 1677 – 20 March 1754) was a French militarist and diplomat.

He served as aide de camp of Marshal Nicolas Catinat in Italy.
He became brigadier in 1704, lieutenant general in 1720 and Marshal of France in 1745. 
He was also ambassador extraordinaire for the French King at the Spanish court in 1720, where he received the Order of the Golden Fleece. He was a commander of the Order of Saint Louis.

His son, Charles Claude Andrault de Langeron (1720–1792), also became a lieutenant general in the King's Army.

Sources 
 Bibliothèque Mazarine, manuscrit 3114

1677 births
1754 deaths
Marshals of France
Commanders of the Order of Saint Louis
Knights of the Golden Fleece of Spain